Thomas Joseph Hallahan  (16 December 1908 – 26 March 1997) was an Australian rules footballer with the Collingwood Football Club and St Kilda Football Club in the Victorian Football League.

Hallahan commenced his footballing career with Collingwood Football Club in 1932.  He played 9 games for Collingwood.  For St Kilda he played a further 14 games in 1933 and 1934.

Hallahan's father, Jim Hallahan, Sr., also played with St Kilda in 1904.

Hallahan's brother, Jim Hallahan, Jr., played with Fitzroy and Footscray.

References

External links

Profile from Collingwood Forever

1908 births
Collingwood Football Club players
St Kilda Football Club players
Rutherglen Football Club players
Australian rules footballers from Victoria (Australia)
1997 deaths